Olli Kervinen (23 March 1924, Pyhäselkä – 23 March 1997), was a Finnish farmer and politician. He served as a Member of the Parliament of Finland from 1962 to 1966, representing the Agrarian League, which renamed itself the Centre Party in 1965.

References

1924 births
1997 deaths
People from Joensuu
Centre Party (Finland) politicians
Members of the Parliament of Finland (1962–66)